The Wairoa River in Northland New Zealand, sometimes referred to as the Northern Wairoa River, runs for 150 kilometres through the northern part of the North Auckland Peninsula. In the upper reaches, the river is formed from two separate rivers, the Mangakahia River and the Wairua River. The two streams meet to the northeast of Dargaville, becoming the Wairoa. It is the longest river in the Northland Region.

The river flows from here firstly southwest (as far as Dargaville) and then southeast for 40 kilometres in a wide navigable estuary which flows into the northern end of the Kaipara Harbour.  For most of its length, this river is tidal.

In the 19th century, the river's swamplands near Dargaville were the most popular location for kauri gum digging.

References

Kaipara District
Rivers of the Northland Region
Rivers of New Zealand
Kaipara Harbour catchment